Auktawgyi is a village in Kalewa Township, Kale District, in the Sagaing Region of western Burma. It lies to the east of the Chindwin River.

References

External links
Maplandia World Gazetteer

Populated places in Kale District
Kalewa Township